Lirophora is a genus of bivalves belonging to the family Veneridae.

The species of this genus are found in America.

Species

Species:

Lirophora agraria 
Lirophora carlottae 
Lirophora cartagenensis

References

Veneridae
Bivalve genera